Off The Record is the fourth solo album by Neil Innes and was released in 1982 featuring songs from the second and third BBC television series of The Innes Book of Records.

Track listing 
All tracks written by Neil Innes

Side one 
 "Libido" - 3:27
 "City of the Angels" - 3:13
 "Them" - 3:22
 "Time to Kill" - 2:46
 "Rock of Ages" - 3:22

Side two 
 "One Thing On Your Mind" - 4:38
 "The Worm and the Angel" - 2:39
 "Not Getting Any Younger" - 4:08
 "Take Away" - 3:29
 "Happy Ending" - 2:28

Side three 
 "Stoned on Rock" - 2:54
 "Knicker Elastic King" - 2:39
 "Spaghetti Western" - 4:11
 "Mr. Eurovision" - 1:57
 "Ungawa" - 3:56

Side four 
 "Godfrey Daniel" - 2:54
 "Fortune Teller" - 3:00
 "Mother" - 3:06
 "Burlesque" - 2:47
 "Down That Road" - 3:22

Single disc, as issued in Canada (Attic LAT 1164)

Side one 
 "Libido" - 3:30
 "City of the Angels" - 3:19
 "Them" - 3:26
 "Rock of Ages" - 3:25
 "Take Away" - 3:31
 "Happy Ending" - 2:27

Side two 
 "Knicker Elastic King" - 4:10
 "Mr. Eurovision" - 2:30
 "Ungawa" - 4:00
 "Godfrey Daniel" - 2:57
 "Mother" - 2:48
 "Down That Road" - 3:23

Personnel 
 Neil Innes is credited as "star"
 Guitar : Ollie Halsall, Lee Fothergill, Mitch Dalton
 Bass guitar : Mo Foster, Paul Westwood
 Pedal guitar : Roger Rettig
 Piano : Morgan Fisher, Keith Nichols
 Banjo : Keith Nelson
 Accordion - Jack Emblow
 Guitar/Banjo - Dick Abel
 Trumpet : Dave Spencer, Digby Fairweather, Alan Downey, Martin Drover, Henry Lowther
 Trombone - Pete Strange, Paul Nieman, Pete Strange, Malcolm Griffiths
 Tuba : Graham Read
 Violins : Geoffrey Salmon, Gerry Richards, Dick Studt, Gavin Wright, Laurie Lewis, Norman Lederman, Lennox Mackenzie, Bruce Dukov
 Viola : Danny Dagger
 Cello : Charles Ford, Nigel Warren-Green, Alan Dalziel
 Double Bass - Harvey Weston
 Woodwind : Bill Skeat, Randy Colville
 Saxophone : Bob Sydor, John Altman
 Saxophone & flute : Keith Gemmell, Pat Kyle
 Drums : Kenny Clare, Peter Van Hooke, Bob Wackett
 Percussion - Frank Ricotti, Louis Jardim, Chris Karan
 Backing vocals : Gary Taylor, Linda Taylor, Joy Yates, Annie Kavanagh, Neil Lancaster, Chas Mills, Jean Gilbert, Kim Goody, Sharon Campbell, Nick Curtis, Ken Barrie, Bob Saker, Kay Garner

References

External links 
Neil Innes solo issues

1982 albums
Neil Innes albums
Albums produced by Neil Innes